Mihály Tóth (born Mihalj Tot - Михаљ Тот - in Bezdan, Kingdom of SCS, 14 September 1926 – Budapest, Hungary, 7 March 1990), was a Hungarian football player during the 1950s and early 1960s. He played for Újpesti Dózsa as a left winger and helped the club win the Nemzeti Bajnokság I in 1959/60. During his time the club was also known as Újpest TE and Budapest Dózsa.

Between 1949 and 1957, Tóth played 6 times for Hungary and scored one goal in the process. The fringe member of the Mighty Magyars also took part in the 1954 World Cup and played in both, the infamous Battle of Berne quarter final against Brazil and in the final against Germany.

Honours
Hungarian Champions: 1
1959/60

External links
  Hungarian "Sportmuzeum" website

Hungarian footballers
1954 FIFA World Cup players
1926 births
1990 deaths
Hungarians in Vojvodina
People from Bezdan
Hungary international footballers
Újpest FC players
Association football forwards
Yugoslav emigrants to Hungary
Nemzeti Bajnokság I players
Sportspeople from Sombor